Nudipleura are a clade of sea snails and sea slugs, marine gastropod mollusks within the large clade Heterobranchia.

Taxonomy

2005 taxonomy 
In the taxonomy of Bouchet & Rocroi (2005), the clade Nudipleura is arranged as follows:

Clade Nudipleura
Clade Pleurobranchomorpha
Clade Nudibranchia
Clade Euctenidiacea
Clade Dexiarchia
Clade Pseudoeuctenidiacea
Clade Cladobranchia
Clade Euarminida
Clade Dendronotida
Clade Aeolidida

2010 taxonomy 
Jörger et al. (2010) have classified Nudipleura within Heterobranchia as a separate clade as follows:

References

External links 

 Sea Slug Forum